Eric "Ari" Brown is an American businessman and politician. He served as the deputy mayor of Cedarhurst, New York until he was elected to the New York State Assembly in a special election on April 7, 2022, and was sworn in on April 25, 2022. He is a Republican.

References 

Living people
Republican Party members of the New York State Assembly
21st-century American politicians
Year of birth missing (living people)